Your Erroneous Zones is the first self-help book written by Wayne Dyer and first issued by Funk & Wagnalls publishers in April 1976.  

It is one of the top-selling books of all time, with an estimated 35 million copies sold. The book spent 64 weeks on The New York Times bestseller list through November 13, 1977, including a spot at number one on the week of May 8, 1977.<ref>The New York Times Best Seller List May 8, 1977 on hawes.com</ref>

Criticism

Psychotherapist Albert Ellis writes that Dyer's book Your Erroneous Zones is probably "the worst example" of plagiarism of Ellis' Rational Emotive Behavioral Therapy (REBT). In a 1985 letter to Dyer, Ellis claims that Dyer had participated in a workshop Ellis gave on REBT before Dyer published his book, in which Dyer appeared to understand REBT very well. Wayne Dyer probably had a fundamental understanding before continuing to explore this idea. Ellis adds that "300 or more people have voluntarily told me... that [the book] was clearly derived from REBT." Dyer never apologized or expressed any sense of wrongdoing. Ellis admonishes Dyer for unethically and unprofessionally not giving Ellis credit as the book's primary source, but expressed overall gratitude for Dyer's work, writing: "Your Erroneous Zones is a good book, ... it has helped a great number of people, and ... it outlines the main principles of REBT quite well,... with great simplicity and clarity."

Note:  Dyer's book Your Erroneous Zones'' mentions Albert Ellis on page 148.

References

Self-help books
1976 non-fiction books